This is a list of airports in Baja California (a Mexican state), grouped by type and sorted by location. It includes public-use, military and private-use airports.



Airports 

Airport names shown in bold indicate the airport has scheduled service on commercial airlines.

See also 
 List of airports in Mexico
 List of airports by ICAO code: M#MM - Mexico
 Wikipedia: WikiProject Aviation/Airline destination lists: North America#Mexico

References 
 
  - includes IATA codes
 Great Circle Mapper: Airports in Mexico, reference for airport codes
 Baja Bush Pilot Airports of Mexico Guide

 
Baja California